Events in the year 2023 in the Czech Republic.

Incumbents 

 President – Miloš Zeman (until March 8); Petr Pavel onwards
 Prime Minister – Petr Fiala

Events

January 
 9 January – Prague’s municipal court acquitted Andrej Babiš of charges of subsidy fraud.
 13 January – 2023 Czech presidential election: Czechs head to the polls to elect their president. Incumbent Miloš Zeman is not eligible to run for re-election, as he is term limited.
 27 January – 2023 Czech presidential election: Czechs head to the polls in the second round of the presidential election.
 28 January – The Czech Statistical Office reports that former NATO Military Committee chair Petr Pavel has been elected President of the Czech Republic, defeating former prime minister Andrej Babiš with 58 percent of the votes.

Sports 

 30 July 2022 – 28 May 2023: 2022–23 Czech First League
 29 July 2022 – 28 May 2023: 2022–23 Czech National Football League
 2022–23 Czech Cup
 2022–23 Czech Women's First League

Deaths 

 2 January – Vasil Timkovič, 99, World War II veteran.
 3 January – Petr Pavlásek, 75, Olympic weightlifter (1972, 1976).
 4 January – Marie Kovářová, 95, gymnast, Olympic champion (1948).
 14 January – Zdeněk Češka, 93, lawyer, academic and politician.
 16 January – Pavel Pecháček, 82, Czech-born American journalist and manager.
 17 January – Stanislav Tereba, 85, photojournalist.
 19 January – Kristina Taberyová, 71, theatre and television director and humanitarian (People in Need).
 20 January – Jiří Macháně, 82, cinematographer (Beauty and the Beast, The Ninth Heart, Černí baroni).
 28 January –
 Jaroslav Šedivý, 93, politician, minister of foreign affairs (1997–1998).
 Jiří Šetlík, 93, art historian and academic.
 31 January – Miroslav Lacký, 79, ice hockey player (HC Vítkovice Ridera, HC Dynamo Pardubice).
 3 February – Naďa Urbánková, 83, singer and actress (Closely Watched Trains, Larks on a String, Seclusion Near a Forest).

 6 February – Lubomír Štrougal, 98, politician, prime minister of Czechoslovakia (1970–1988).

References 

 
2020s in the Czech Republic
Years of the 21st century in the Czech Republic
Czech Republic
Czech Republic